The 2006–07 Arizona Wildcats men's basketball team represented the University of Arizona during the 2006–07 NCAA Division I men's basketball season. The Wildcats, led by head coach Lute Olson, played their home games at the McKale Center and are members of the Pacific-10 Conference.

Recruiting class
Source:

Roster

Depth chart

Schedule

|-
!colspan=9 style="background:#; color:white;"| Regular season

|-
!colspan=9 style="background:#;"| Pac-10 tournament

|-
!colspan=9 style="background:#;"| NCAA tournament

Awards
Chase Budinger
Pac-10 Freshman of the Year
Pac-10 All-Freshman First Team
Pac-10 Player of the Week – November 11, 2006
Marcus Williams
Pac-10 All-Conference 
Ivan Radenovic
Pac-10 Player of the Week – January 1, 2007
Pac-10 Player of the Week – March 5, 2007

References

Arizona Wildcats men's basketball seasons
Arizona Wildcats
Arizona
Arizona Wildcats
Arizona Wildcats